Rosanna Marie Raymond  (born 1967) is a New Zealand artist, poet, and cultural commentator and Raymond was recognised for "Pasifika artists practicing contemporary and heritage art forms in Aotearoa," winning the Senior Pacific Artist Award Winner of 2018, at the Arts Pasifika Awards through Creative New Zealand.

Background 
Raymond was born 1967 in Auckland, New Zealand. A New Zealand born third generation Moana of Sāmoan,Tuvaluan, Irish and French descent.  

She completed a master's degree at Auckland University of Technology in 2021 with a thesis titled "C o n s e r . V Ā . t i o n | A c t i . V Ā . t i o n Museums, the body and Indigenous Moana art practice".

Career 
Raymond is a member of the Pacific and Māori collective, Pacific Sisters.

In 2008, with Amiria Manutahi Salmond, Raymond published Pasifika Styles: Artists Inside the Museum. 

In 2010 Raymond launched the SaVAge K’lub project at the Queensland Art Gallery. The project in an installation space that has hosted artworks, spoken word, and performance art from over twenty five artists, including Ani O'Neill, Grace Taylor, and Suzanne Tamaki. SaVAge K’lub is in reference to an establishment in London a historical ninetieth century gentleman's club. Despite the cultural stereotypes and decor of such exclusive institutions Raymonds version removes the gendered and elitist elements. Evolving into a multidisciplinary platform that collects individuals Ideas, practices and knowledge that engenders "Raymond's central kaupapa: to bring about the non-cannabilistic cognitive consumption of 'the Other and opened discussion of space."

Raymond is an honorary research associate at the Department of Anthropology and Institute of Archaeology at University College London. In 2017 she gave the Peter Turner Memorial Lecture at Massey University.

Raymond also works as an exhibition curator. In 2016 she curated Ata Te Tangata, an exhibition of photography by Māori and Pacific artists that toured to China. In 2018 Raymond curated the annual Tautai tertiary exhibition.

At the Arts Pasifika Awards in 2018 Raymond was awarded the Senior Pacific Artist Award.

In the 2023 New Year Honours, Raymond was appointed a Member of the New Zealand Order of Merit, for services to Pacific art.

Works by Raymond are held in the collection of the Museum of New Zealand Te Papa Tongarewa and the Auckland Art Gallery Toi o Tāmaki.

Artist residencies 
 2005 – The Center for Pacific Islands Studies Visiting Artist Program- University of Hawaii, Honolulu 
 2006 – Sansburry centre for Visual Arts (SCVA)  
 2008 – De Young Museum San Francisco
 2014 – Ethnological Museum Berlin
 2017 – Matairangi Mahi Toi Artist Residency at Government House- (Massey University College of Creative Arts Toi Rauwhārangi)

References

Further reading 
Artist files for Rosanna Raymond are held at:
 E. H. McCormick Research Library, Auckland Art Gallery Toi o Tāmaki
 Te Aka Matua Research Library, Museum of New Zealand Te Papa Tongarewa

Living people
1967 births
People from Auckland
New Zealand women artists
People associated with the Museum of New Zealand Te Papa Tongarewa
Auckland University of Technology alumni
New Zealand women curators
Members of the New Zealand Order of Merit